Marius Re Goring,  (23 May 191230 September 1998) was a English stage and screen actor. He is best remembered for the four films he made with Powell & Pressburger, particularly as Conductor 71 in A Matter of Life and Death and as Julian Craster in The Red Shoes. He is also known for playing the title role in the long-running TV drama series, The Expert. He regularly performed French and German roles, and was frequently cast in the latter because of his name, coupled with his red-gold hair and blue eyes. However, in a 1965 interview, he explained that he was not of German descent, stating that "Goring is a completely English name."

Life and career
Goring was born in Newport, Isle of Wight, the son of the eminent physician and researcher Dr Charles Buckman Goring (1870-1919), the author of The English Convict, and Kate Winifred (née Macdonald, 1874–1964), a professional pianist of Scottish descent who was also a suffragette. He had an older brother, Donald, who died in Yemen, in 1936, from injuries sustained in a motor vehicle accident. After attending The Perse School in Cambridge, where he became a friend of an older boy, the future documentary film maker Humphrey Jennings, Goring studied modern languages at the universities of Frankfurt, Munich, Vienna and Paris. Encouraged by both of his parents to pursue his acting ambitions, he made his professional debut in 1927 playing Harlequin, and toured the continent playing classical roles with the Compagnie des Quinze. He toured under the directorship of Michel Saint-Denis, whom he would later encourage to come to England and work as a director. He also studied under Harcourt Williams and at the Old Vic dramatic school from 1929 to 1932. His early stage career included appearances at the Old Vic, Sadler's Wells, Stratford and several European tours; he was fluent in French and German. During the 1930s, he played a variety of Shakespearean roles at the Old Vic, including the title role in Macbeth and Romeo in Romeo and Juliet (1933), Feste in Twelfth Night (1937), in addition to Trip in Sheridan's The School for Scandal. He first worked in the West End in a 1934 revival of Granville-Barker's The Voysey Inheritance at the Shaftesbury Theatre.

In 1929, he became a founding member of British Equity, the actors' union, served on its council from 1949 and was three times its vice-president from 1963 to 1965, 1975 to 1977 and again from 1980 to 1982. Goring's relationship with his union was fraught with conflict: he took it to litigation on three occasions. In 1978, regarding the issue of the supremacy of a referendum to decide Equity rules, he took it as far as the House of Lords and won his case. In 1992, he unsuccessfully sought to end the restriction on the sale of radio and television programmes to apartheid South Africa. Stressing that he opposed apartheid and would not perform for segregated audiences, he argued that the ban was depriving actors of work, and stated that he wished to stage a production of the play She Stoops to Conquer with an all-black cast. This particular litigation nearly bankrupted him, due to the heavy amount of court costs.

In November 1931, at the age of nineteen, he married twenty-nine year old Mary Westwood Steel (1902-1994) at Gretna Green, Scotland (they had a second marriage ceremony in a London register office in February 1932) and their only child, a daughter Phyllida Mariette Goring, was born in March 1932 and died in 2018. The marriage did not succeed and he became engaged in 1935 to ballet choreographer and designer, Susan 'Susy' Salaman, older sister of Merula Salaman, wife of Alec Guinness. Susy contracted acute encephalitis in late 1935 and was left brain-damaged. Goring wanted to go ahead with the wedding but Susy's father, Michel Salaman, would not allow it.

In 1935, he co-founded the London Theatre Studio with Michel Saint-Denis, George Devine and Glen Byam Shaw. It trained actors, directors and designers and was a precursor of the Old Vic Theatre School. Marius taught Shakespeare there to the students. It had to close in late 1939 due to the outbreak of war.

  

Goring's film career began with an uncredited role in The Amateur Gentleman  (1936) with Douglas Fairbanks Jr and a small speaking role in Rembrandt (also 1936). He shared his one scene in this film with the star Charles Laughton, with whom he had previously worked on stage at the Old Vic. He made two further films released in 1939: Flying Fifty-Five with Derrick de Marney where he showed off his comedic skills playing an amusing drunkard and co-starred with Conrad Veidt in his first Powell and Pressburger film, The Spy in Black, an intriguing spy thriller set during World War One, where he played a German officer for the first of many times in his film career.

When war was declared in September 1939, he was back in the West End as Pip in a production of Great Expectations, adapted for the stage by Alec Guinness. Along with all other plays, it was closed down temporarily by the war but was the first to resume when theatres were reopened in early 1940. He joined the British Army in June 1940, and was seconded in 1941 to the BBC as supervisor of radio productions broadcasting to Germany. He made broadcasts under the name Charles Richardson (using his father's first name and maternal grandmother's maiden name), because of the association of his name with Hermann Göring. In 1944 he became a member of the intelligence staff of SHAEF (Supreme Headquarters Allied Expeditionary Force) where he attained the rank of colonel. Because of the broadcasts he had been making to Germany, set up by the Foreign Office as an antidote to William Joyce (Lord Haw-Haw), he was put on a Nazi hit-list.

In 1941, he married his second wife, the German actress Lucie Mannheim (1899-1976). Mannheim, who was Jewish, had been a principal actress in the Berlin Theatre but had to leave Germany when the Nazis came to power. She worked with Goring in many stage productions from the 1930s onwards and in seven episodes of The Adventures of the Scarlet Pimpernel, one of which he wrote especially for her, as well as in several films. Mannheim died in 1976, and the next year Goring married television director/producer Prudence Fitzgerald (1930-2018), who had directed him in many episodes of The Expert.

In the film A Matter of Life and Death (1946) Goring played Conductor 71, whose role is to 'conduct' Peter Carter (David Niven) to the afterlife. In the film The Red Shoes, he played Julian Craster, a young composer who wins the heart of ballerina Vicky Page (Moira Shearer) and clashes with the imperious ballet impresario, Boris Lermontov (Anton Walbrook). In the film Odette released in the UK in 1950, Goring played the role of Colonel Henri, a German Abwehr (Military Intelligence) officer who deceived and captured Odette. The film is based on the true story of Odette Sansom, the first living woman to be awarded the George Cross. The real Odette Sansom was later a witness at his marriage to Prudence Fitzgerald in 1977. He played Colonel Günther von Hohensee in So Little Time (1952), which also featured Maria Schell, one of his rare romantic leads and frequent roles playing a German officer. He considered the film one of his favourites, alongside the four films he made with Powell and Pressburger.

His TV work included starring as Sir Percy Blakeney in The Adventures of the Scarlet Pimpernel (ITV, 1955) (a role which he also performed in a 1952-53 radio show), a series which he also co-wrote and produced; Theodore Maxtible in the Doctor Who story The Evil of the Daleks (BBC, 1967); Professor John Hardy in The Expert (BBC, 1968–1976); Paul von Hindenburg in Fall of Eagles (BBC, 1974); King George V in Edward & Mrs. Simpson (Thames, 1980) and Emile Englander in The Old Men at the Zoo (BBC, 1983).

Goring's voice provides the narration of the sound and light show performed regularly in the evening at the Blue Mosque in Istanbul, Turkey.

He was made a Fellow of the Royal Society of Literature in 1979 and appointed Commander of the Order of the British Empire (CBE) in 1991. He died from stomach cancer in 1998 aged 86 at his home in Rushlake Green, East Sussex, survived by his third wife, Prudence and daughter, Phyllida. He is buried in the churchyard of St Mary the Virgin, Warbleton, East Sussex near Rushlake Green with his wife, Prudence, who died in 2018.

Complete filmography

 The Amateur Gentleman (1936) - Minor Role (uncredited)
 Rembrandt (1936) - Baron Leivens (uncredited)
 Dead Men Tell No Tales (1938) - Greening
 Consider Your Verdict (1938 short) - The Novelist
 Flying Fifty-Five (1939) - Charles Barrington
 The Spy in Black * (1939) - Lt. Felix Schuster
 Pastor Hall (1940) - Fritz Gerte
 The Case of the Frightened Lady (1940) - Lord Lebanon
 The Big Blockade (1942) - German Propaganda Officer
 The Night Invader (1943) - Oberleutnant
 The True Story of Lili Marlene (1944) - Narrator
 Night Boat to Dublin (1946) - Frederick Jannings
 A Matter of Life and Death * (1946) - Conductor 71
 Take My Life (1947) - Sidney Fleming
 The Red Shoes * (1948) - Julian Craster
 Mr. Perrin and Mr. Traill (1948) - Vincent Perrin
 Odette (1950) - Colonel Henri
 Highly Dangerous (1950) - Commandant Anton Razinski
 Pandora and the Flying Dutchman (1951) - Reggie Demarest
 Circle of Danger (1951) - Sholto Lewis
 The Magic Box (1951) - House Agent
 Nights on the Road (1952) - Kurt Willbrandt
 So Little Time (1952) - Colonel Günther von Hohensee
 The Man Who Watched Trains Go By (1952) - Inspector Lucas
 Rough Shoot (1953) - Hiart
 The Mirror and Markheim (1954, short) - Narrator
 The Barefoot Contessa (1954) - Alberto Bravano
 Break in the Circle (1955) - Baron Keller
 The Adventures of Quentin Durward (1955) - Count Philip de Creville
 Gaslicht (1956, TV Movie) - Jack Manningham
 The Magic Carpet (1956, Short)
 Ill Met by Moonlight * (1957) - Major General Kreipe
 The Truth About Women (1957) - Otto Kerstein
 Rx Murder (1958) - Doctor Henry Dysert
 The Moonraker (1958) - Colonel Beaumont
 An Ideal Husband (1958, TV Movie) - Lord Goring
 I Was Monty's Double (1958) - Karl Nielson
 The Son of Robin Hood (1958) - Chester
 The Angry Hills (1959) - Col. Elrick Oberg
 Whirlpool (1959) - Georg
 Asmodée (1959, TV Movie) - Blaise Lebel
 The Treasure of San Teresa (1959) - Rudi Siebert
 Desert Mice (1959) - German Major
 Beyond the Curtain (1960) - Hans Körtner
 Exodus (1960) - Von Storch
 The Unstoppable Man (1961) - Inspector Hazelrigg
 The Devil's Daffodil (1961) - Oliver Milburgh
 The Secret Thread (1962, TV Movie) - Arnold Reed
 The Inspector (1962) - Thorens
 The Devil's Agent (1962) - Gen. Greenhahn
 The Crooked Road (1965) - Harlequin
 Up from the Beach (1965) - German Commandant
 The 25th Hour (1967) - Col. Muller
 Der Monat der fallenden Blätter (1968, TV Movie) - Erster Geheimagent
 The Girl on a Motorcycle (1968) - Rebecca's Father
 Subterfuge (1968) - Shevik
 First Love (1970) - Dr. Lushin
 Zeppelin (1971) - Prof. Altschul
 La petite fille en velours bleu (1978) - Raimondo Casarès
 Meetings with Remarkable Men (1979)
 Cymbeline (1982, TV Movie) - Sicilius Leonatus
 Strike It Rich (1990) - Blixon (final film role)

* Powell and Pressburger productions

Television appearances
 The Bear (1938 short film): Grigory Stepanovitch Smirnov, a landowner with Lucie Mannheim
 Box for One (1949 short film): The Caller
 On the Harmful Effects of Tobacco (1952 BBC TV): Ivan Ivanovich Nyukhin
 You Are There (series) (1953–1972 CBS TV series): Oliver Cromwell in ‘The Trial of Charles the First’ (1954)
 Douglas Fairbanks Presents (1953–57 NBC TV series): Nicol Pascal in ‘The Rehearsal’ (1954)
 Lilli Palmer Theatre (1955–56 ITC/NBC TV series): Reinhardt in ‘Mossbach Collection’ (1955) and Major Edward Carter in ‘Episode in Paris’ (1956)
 The Adventures of the Scarlet Pimpernel (1955–56 ITC TV series): Sir Percy Blakeney/The Scarlet Pimpernel in eighteen episodes with Lucie Mannheim in seven episodes
 Many Mansions (1957 BBC TV short): Lester Hockley
 BBC Sunday Night Theatre (1950–59 BBC TV series): Tommy Savidge in ‘Promise of Tomorrow’ (1950); Chorus in ‘The Life of Henry V’ (1951); Hjalmar Ekdal in ‘The Wild Duck’ (1952); General Harras in ‘The Devil’s General’ (1955); Dr Cranmer in ‘The White Falcon’ (1956); Crystof Walters in ‘The Cold Light’ (1956); Robert Clive in ‘Clive of India’ (1956) and Richard Brinsley Sheridan in ‘The Lass of Richmond Hill’ (1957)
 International Detective (1959–61 ABPC TV series): Ferdie Steibel in ‘The Steibel Case’ (1960)
 BBC Sunday-Night Play (1960–63 BBC TV series): Alexis Turbin in ‘The White Guard’ (1960); General Harras in ‘The Devil’s General’ (1960); Laye-Parker in ‘A Call on Kuprin (1961) and John Lock in ‘The Money Machine’ (1962)
 Drama 61-67 (1961–67 ATV TV series): Captain in ‘The Cruel Day’ (1961) and Mervyn in ‘Room for Justice’ (1962)
 24-Hour Call (1963 ATV TV series): Sam Bullivant in ‘Love for Caroline’
 First Night (1963–64 BBC TV series): Grieve Wishart in ‘The Youngest Profession’ (1963)
 Maigret (1960–63 BBC TV series): Peter the Lett in ‘Peter the Lett’ (1963)
 The Third Man (1959–65 BBC TV series): Colonel Dimonella in ‘A Question in Ice’ (1964)
 Love Story (1963–74 ATV TV series): Robert Langley in ‘In Loving Memory’ (1964)
 The Great War (1964 BBC/ABC/CBC TV documentary series): Various voices in twenty-six episodes
 The Mask of Janus (1965 BBC TV series): Dr Kapaka in ‘Why Not Call Me Kruschev?’
 Thirteen Against Fate (1966 BBC TV series): Monsieur Hire in ‘The Suspect’
 Out of the Unknown (1966–71 BBC TV series): Wattari in ‘Too Many Cooks’ (1966)
 ITV Play of the Week (1955–74 ITV TV series): John Hagerman in ‘The Breath of Fools’ (1957); Purcell in ‘The Darkness Outside’ (1960); Charles Norbury in ‘The Sound of Murder’ (1964), Lewis Eliot in ‘The New Men’ (1966) and Robert Cosgrove in ‘On the Island’ (1967)
 The Revenue Men (1967–68 BBC TV series): Kersten in ‘The Traders’ (1967)
 Sir Arthur Conan Doyle  (1967 BBC TV series): Lord Linchmere in ‘The Beetle Hunter’
 Doctor Who (1963–? BBC TV Series): Theodore Maxtible in The Evil of the Daleks (six episodes in 1967)
 The Wednesday Play (1964–1970 BBC TV series): Reverend Harrup in ‘A Walk in the Sea’ (1966) and Sir Hubert in ‘Sleeping Dogs’ (1967)
 Man in a Suitcase (1967–68 ITC TV series): Henri Thibaud in ‘Blind Spot’ (1968)
 Le dossiers de l’agence O (1968 COFERC/ORTF TV Series): Madame Sacramento in ‘Le club des vieilles dames’ (French TV series)
 Thirty-Minute Theatre (1965–73 BBC TV series): Mr Ponge in ‘Mr Ponge’ (1965) and The Interrogator in ‘The Year of the Crow’ (1970)
 The Expert (1968–76 BBC TV series): Professor John Hardy in sixty-two episodes
 Fall of Eagles (1974 BBC TV mini-series): Von Hindenburg in ‘The Secret War’ and ‘End Game’
 2nd House (1973–76 BBC TV series): Humboldt in ‘Saul Bellow’ (1975)
 Wilde Alliance (1978 ITV TV Series): Rex in ‘Things That Go Bump’
 Holocaust (1978 CBS TV mini-series): Heinrich Palitz in Part One
 Edward & Mrs. Simpson (1979 ITV TV mini-series): King George V in ‘Venus at the Prow’ and ‘The Little Prince’
 House of Caradus (1979 Granada TV series): Bronksy in ‘The Girl in the Blue Dress’
 Tales of the Unexpected (1979–88 Anglia TV series): Dr John Landy in ‘William and Mary’ (1979)
 Hammer House of Horror (1980 ITC TV series): Heinz in ‘Charlie Boy’
 Levkas Man (1981 ABC Australia TV series): Dr Pieter Gerrard in six episodes
 The Year of the French (TV serial) (1982 RTE/Channel 4/FR3 France 6 part series): Lord Glenthorne in Episode One
 The Old Men at the Zoo (1983 BBC TV series): Emile Englander in five episodes
 Hammer House of Mystery and Suspense (1984–85 ITV TV series): Angus Aragon in ‘The Late Nancy Irving’ (1984)
 Gnostics (1987 Channel 4 TV series): Episode 3: Divinity of Man: Hermes Trismegistus & Prospero (1987)

Stage appearances
 Crossings: A Fairy Play (1925) as a Fairy with Angela Baddeley at the ADC Theatre, Cambridge. This was his amateur theatrical debut
 Jean Stirling Mackinlay Children's Matinee: Dr Doolittle's Play (1927) as Harlequin at The Rudolf Steiner Hall, London. This was his professional theatrical debut
 Jean Stirling Mackinlay Children's Matinee: Dr Doolittle's Play & King John's Christmas (1928) as Harlequin at The Rudolf Steiner Hall, London
 Les Femmes Savantes (1930) as Trissotin at the ADC Theatre, Cambridge
 Shakespearean rôles with the English Classical Players (1931) touring France and Germany
 Hamlet and several parts with the Compagnie des Quinze (1931) in France and the Low Countries
 Julius Caesar (1932) as a Spear Carrier at The Old Vic, London
 Caesar and Cleopatra (1932) as Persian at The Old Vic, London and Sadler's Wells Theatre, London
 As You Like It (1932) as Le Beau at The Old Vic, London
 Macbeth (1932) as Macbeth at The Old Vic, London and Sadler's Wells Theatre, London. He undertook 3 performances as Macbeth when Malcolm Keen (Macbeth) and understudy Alastair Sim (Malcolm) were too incapacitated to perform
 The Merchant of Venice  (1932) as Salanio at The Old Vic, London. Directed by John Gielgud
 She Stoops to Conquer (1933) as Aminadab at The Old Vic, London
 The Winter's Tale (1933) as Cleomenes at The Old Vic, London
 Cymbeline (1932) as Second Lord at The Old Vic, London
 The Admirable Bashville (1933) as First Policeman with Anthony Quayle, Alastair Sim and Roger Livesey at The Old Vic, London
 Romeo and Juliet (1933) as Romeo with Peggy Ashcroft as Juliet at The Old Vic, London and Sadler's Wells Theatre, London
 The School for Scandal (1933) as Trip with Alastair Sim, Peggy Ashcroft, Roger Livesey and Anthony Quayle at The Old Vic, London
 Shakespeare Birthday Festival (1933) at The Old Vic, London
 The Tempest (1933) as Adrian at The Old Vic, London and Sadler's Wells Theatre, London
 A Midsummer Night's Dream (1933) as a Faerie with the Oxford University Dramatic Society at Headington Hill Park, Oxford (outdoor performance). Produced & directed by Max Reinhardt
 Twelfth Night (1933) as Sebastian at The Old Vic, London
 The Cherry Orchard (1933) as Yepikhodov with Charles Laughton, Elsa Lanchester, Flora Robson and James Mason at The Old Vic, London. Directed by Michel Saint-Denis
 Henry VIII (1933) as Cardinal Campeius/Garter King of Arms with Charles Laughton, Roger Livesey and Flora Robson at Sadler's Wells Theatre, London
 Measure for Measure (1933) as Friar Peter/Abhorson with Charles Laughton, Roger Livesey and Flora Robson at The Old Vic, London
 The Tempest (1934) as Alonso at Sadler's Wells Theatre, London
 Love for Love (1934) as Buckram with Charles Laughton, Flora Robson, Roger Livesey and James Mason at Sadler's Wells Theatre, London
 Shakespeare Birthday Festival (1934) at The Old Vic, London
 Macbeth (1934) as Malcolm with Charles Laughton as Macbeth at The Old Vic, London
 The Voysey Inheritance (1934) as Hugh Voysey at Sadler's Wells Theatre, London and Shaftesbury Theatre, London. The Shaftesbury Theatre was his first appearance in the West End
 Shakespeare Birthday Festival (1935) at The Old Vic, London
 Hamlet (1935) as Hamlet (short version) and Fortinbras (long version) at The Old Vic, London. Malcolm Keen played Hamlet in the full version performances
 Noah (1935) as Japheth with John Gielgud as Noah at the New Theatre, London. Directed by Michel Saint-Denis
 The Hangman (1935) as Gallows Lasse at the Duke of York's Theatre, London
 Sowers of the Hills (1935) as Aubert at the Westminster Theatre, London. Directed by Michel Saint-Denis
 Mary Tudor (1935–1936) as Philip of Spain with Flora Robson as Mary Tudor at Streatham Hill Theatre, Golders Green Hippodrome, Playhouse Theatre, London and Sadler's Wells Theatre, London
 Repayment (1936) as Paul Novak with Margaret Lockwood at the Arts Theatre, London
 The Happy Hypocrite (1936) as Amor with Ivor Novello and Vivien Leigh at His Majesty's Theatre, London
 The Ante-Room (1936) as Vincent de Courcy O'Regan with Diana Wynyard and Jessica Tandy at the King's Theatre, Edinburgh and the Manchester Opera House
 Girl Unknown (1936) as Max with Lucie Mannheim at the New Theatre, London and the Golders Green Hippodrome. Produced by Lucie Mannheim
 The Wild Duck (1936) as Gregors Werle at the Westminster Theatre, London
 The Witch of Edmonton (1936) as Frank Thorney with Edith Evans, Alec Guinness and Michael Redgrave at The Old Vic, London. Directed by Michel Saint-Denis
 Hamlet (1936-1937) as First Player and Fortinbras with Laurence Olivier as Hamlet, Michael Redgrave and Alec Guinness at The Old Vic, London
 Twelfth Night (1937) as Feste with Laurence Olivier and Alec Guinness at The Old Vic, London
 Shakespeare Birthday Festival (1937) at The Old Vic, London
 Henry V (1937) as Chorus with Laurence Olivier as Henry V at The Old Vic, London
 Satyr (1937) as Peter de Meyer with A. E. Matthews and Flora Robson at King's Theatre, Edinburgh and Shaftesbury Theatre, London
 A Woman Killed with Kindness (1937) 5 scenes at the London Theatre Studio. He produced and directed this performance but did not appear in it
 The Last Straw (1937) as Wolfe Guldeford with Lucie Mannheim at the Comedy Theatre, London. Produced & directed by Lucie Mannheim
 Surprise Item (1938) as Arthur Primmer at the Ambassadors Theatre, London
 Henry Irving Centenary Matinee - Scene from Louis XI (1938) at the Lyceum Theatre, London
 The White Guard (1938) as Leonid Shervinsky at the Phoenix Theatre, London. Directed by Michel Saint-Denis
 Nora (1939) with Lucie Mannheim at the Duke of York's Theatre, London. Marius produced this play but did not appear in it
 Lady Fanny (1939) as Lord Bantock with Lucie Mannheim at the Duke of York's Theatre, London. He also directed this production
 Nina (1939) as Schimmelmann with Lucie Mannheim as Nina at Gaiety Theatre, Dublin and Duke of York's Theatre, London. He also directed this production
 Hamlet (1939) as First Player and Osric with John Gielgud as Hamlet performed at the Lyceum Theatre, London and at Kronborg, Helsingør, Denmark.  He co-directed this production with John Gielgud
 Great Expectations (1939–1940) as Pip at The Rudolf Steiner Hall, London. Play adapted by Alec Guinness from the novel by Charles Dickens
 The Tempest (1940) as Ariel with John Gielgud as Prospero and Alec Guinness as Ferdinand at The Old Vic, London
 Monsieur Lamberthier (1947) as Maurice with Lucie Mannheim in English and German on tour in Germany (British Zone)
 Rosmersholm (1948) as Johannes Rosmer with his wife Lucie Mannheim as Rebecca West at the Arts Theatre, London. He also directed this production
 Too True To Be Good (1948) as Aubrey Bagot with Lucie Mannheim at the Arts Theatre, London. He also directed this production
 The Cherry Orchard (1948) as Peter Trofimov at the Arts Theatre, London
 Marriage (1948) as Ivan Kuzmich Podkolyosin with Lucie Mannheim at the Arts Theatre, London
 The Bear (1948) as Grigory Stepanovitch Smirnov with Lucie Mannheim at the Arts Theatre, London
 The Third Man/Jealousy/Monsieur Lamberthier (1948-1949) as Maurice with Lucie Mannheim at the Arts Theatre, London, Oldham Repertory Theatre Club, Manchester and on tour in Germany
 Daphne Laureola (1949) as Ernest Piaste with Lucie Mannheim as Lady Pitts on tour in Germany
 The Madwoman of Chaillot (1951) as The Rag Picker with Martita Hunt at the St James's Theatre, London
 Richard III (1953) as Richard III at the Shakespeare Memorial Theatre, Stratford
 Antony and Cleopatra (1953) as Octavius Caesar with Michael Redgrave as Antony and Peggy Ashcroft as Cleopatra at the Shakespeare Memorial Theatre, Stratford and the Princes Theatre, London
 The Taming of the Shrew (1953) as Petruchio with Yvonne Mitchell as Katherina at the Shakespeare Memorial Theatre, Stratford
 King Lear (1953) as The Fool with Michael Redgrave as Lear at the Shakespeare Memorial Theatre, Stratford
 Antony and Cleopatra (1954) as Octavius Caesar with Michael Redgrave as Antony and Peggy Ashcroft as Cleopatra at the Koninklijke Schouwburg, The Hague & Royal Theatre Carré, Amsterdam, The Netherlands, Koninklijke Nederlandse Schouwburg, Antwerp & Theatre Royal de la Monnaie, Brussels, Belgium and Théâtre des Champs-Élysées, Paris, France
 Scenes from Shakespeare (1957) leading a company to France at the Théâtre National Populaire, Paris and Annecy, Lyons, Lille, Amiens and Douai
 Scenes from Shakespeare (1957) leading a company to Helsinki, Finland including Rachel Gurney, Yvonne Furneaux, Roger Gage, Jennifer Wilson and John Laurie
 Scenes from Shakespeare and Classical English Theatre (1958) leading a company to India and Ceylon including Rachel Gurney, Yvonne Furneaux, Roger Gage, Jennifer Wilson and John Laurie
 Savonarola Brown (1960) as Savonarola Brown at the Royal Festival Hall, South Bank, London
 Measure for Measure (1962) as Angelo with Judi Dench as Isabella (Royal Shakespeare Company production) at the Royal Shakespeare Theatre, Stratford
 A Penny for a Song (1962) as Sir Timothy Bellboys with Judi Dench as Dorcas Bellboys (Royal Shakespeare Company production) at the Aldwych Theatre, London
 Menage à Trois (1963) as Charles with Phyllis Calvert at the Lyric Theatre, London
 King Arthur (1963) as the Narrator at the Victoria and Albert Museum, London
 The Poker Session (1963–1964) as Teddy at the Gate Theatre, Dublin in the Dublin Theatre Festival (1963) and the Globe Theatre, London (1964). Marius played Teddy in the premiere production in Dublin
 Oedipus rex (1963) as the Narrator at the Royal Festival Hall, South Bank, London
 King Arthur (1964) as the Narrator at the Royal Albert Hall, London
 The Apple Cart (1965) as King Magnus with Barbara Murray at the Cambridge Arts Theatre, Manchester Opera House, New Wimbledon Theatre, Theatre Royal, Brighton and Golders Green Hippodrome, London 
 The Devil's Disciple (1965) as General Burgoyne with Ian Bannen at the Yvonne Arnaud Theatre, Guildford
 The Bells (1967–1968) as Mathias at the Derby Playhouse, The Alexandra, Birmingham, the Grand Theatre, Leeds and the Vaudeville Theatre, London. He also directed it in its Birmingham, Leeds and London productions
 Married Bliss (1968) at The Alexandra, Birmingham and Grand Theatre, Leeds. He directed this play only and did not act in it. It was curtain raiser to The Bells
 Lend Me Five Shillings (1968) as Mr Golighty. He also directed it in its production at the Vaudeville Theatre, London. It was curtain raiser to The Bells
 The Demonstration (1969) as Professor Bright at the Nottingham Playhouse
 Sleuth (1971–1973) as Andrew Wyke at the St Martin's Theatre, London
 If Music and Sweet Poetry Agree (1972) with the Royal Shakespeare Company at the Royal Shakespeare Theatre, Stratford
 Tribute to the Lady (1974) at The Old Vic, London
 The Wisest Fool (1974) as James I at Yvonne Arnaud Theatre, Guildford, The Alexandra, Birmingham, Grand Theatre, Wolverhampton, Civic Theatre, Darlington, Ashcroft Theatre, Croydon, Richmond Theatre, London, Theatre Royal, Bath, Grand Theatre, Leeds and Hull New Theatre
 The Concert (1975) as Gustav Hein with Barbara Murray at the York Theatre Royal and the Forum Theatre, Billingham
 This Wooden O (1975) at the Bankside Globe Playhouse, London
 Habeas Corpus (1975) as Arthur Wicksteed at the Liverpool Playhouse
 The Sun King (1976) at the Tatton Park, Cheshire and Royal Festival Hall, London
 Sleuth (1976) as Andrew Wyke at the Liverpool Playhouse
 Jubilee Gaieties (1977) at the Marlowe Theatre, Canterbury, Ashcroft Theatre, Croydon, New Wimbledon Theatre, London, Devonshire Park Theatre, Eastbourne, Theatre Royal, Windsor and Wyvern Theatre, Swindon
 Royal Thames (1977) at the Theatre Royal Haymarket with Judi Dench
 Exit: Pursued by a Bear (1977) at the Pitlochry Festival Theatre
 The Sun King (1978) at the Old Town Hall, Hemel Hempstead
 Woe to the Sparrows (1980) as Emperor Franz Josef at Northcott Theatre, Exeter
 Habeas Corpus (1981) as Arthur Wicksteed at the Royal Lyceum Theatre, Edinburgh
 The Sun King (1981) at the Theatre Royal, Windsor
 Zaide (1982) as the Narrator at The Old Vic, London
 The Sun King (1982) at the Fermoy Centre, King's Lynn (King's Lynn Festival)
 Peer Gynt (1982) as the Button Moulder at the Nottingham Playhouse, Nottingham
 The Sun King (1983) at the Queen Elizabeth Hall, South Bank, London
 Metamorphoses (Opera) (1983) as Ovid at the Parry Theatre, Royal College of Music, London
 The Dame of Sark (1984) as Colonel Count von Schmettau at the Lyceum Theatre, Crewe, Playhouse Theatre, Harlow and Key Theatre, Peterborough
 The Winslow Boy (1984) as Arthur Winslow at the Forum Theatre, Wythenshawe, Grand Opera House, Belfast, Theatre Royal, Norwich, Beck Theatre, Hayes, Towngate Theatre, Poole, Kings Theatre, Southsea, Richmond Theatre, London, Civic Theatre, Darlington, Babbacombe Theatre, Torquay, Theatre Royal, Plymouth, New Theatre Royal Lincoln, Liverpool Empire Theatre, Swan Theatre, Worcester, His Majesty's Theatre, Aberdeen, Orchard Theatre, Dartford and Ashcroft Theatre, Croydon
 I Have Been Here Before (1985) as Dr Görtler at the Cambridge Arts Theatre, Marlowe Theatre, Canterbury, King's Theatre, Glasgow, Eden Court Theatre, Inverness, Kings Theatre, Southsea, Towngate Theatre, Poole, Ashcroft Theatre, Croydon, The Capitol Theatre, Horsham, Grand Theatre, Wolverhampton, Forum Theatre, Billingham, Oxford Playhouse, His Majesty's Theatre, Aberdeen, Key Theatre, Peterborough and New Theatre, Cardiff
 The Apple Cart (1985–86) as Nicobar with Peter O'Toole and Michael Denison at the Theatre Royal, Bath and the Theatre Royal Haymarket, London
 Mystery Plays (1986) as God at Canterbury Cathedral
 Beyond Reasonable Doubt (1988-89) as Lionel Hamilton at the Queens Theatre, London
 Towards Zero (1989) as Matthew Treves at the Churchill Theatre, Bromley, Theatre Royal, Brighton, Cambridge Arts Theatre, The Hexagon, Reading, The Alexandra, Birmingham, Theatre Royal, Nottingham, Hull New Theatre, Derngate Theatre, Northampton, Grand Theatre, Blackpool, Grand Theatre, Wolverhampton, Theatre Royal, Margate, Liverpool Empire Theatre, New Theatre Royal Lincoln, Ashcroft Theatre, Croydon, Wyvern Theatre, Swindon, Theatre Royal, Windsor, Theatre Royal, Newcastle, Manchester Opera House, Forum Theatre, Billingham, His Majesty's Theatre, Aberdeen and Eden Court Theatre, Inverness 
 Sunsets and Glories (1990) as Cardinal Latino Malabranca Orsini at the West Yorkshire Leeds Playhouse, Leeds with Freddie Jones as Pope Celestine V. Directed by Stuart Burge
 Cerceau (1992) at the Orange Tree Theatre, Richmond

References

External links
 Official website
 The British Film Institute profile
 

Commanders of the Order of the British Empire
English male film actors
English male stage actors
English male television actors
English people of Scottish descent
Fellows of the Royal Society of Literature
Goethe University Frankfurt alumni
Instructors of the London Theatre Studio
Ludwig Maximilian University of Munich alumni
People educated at The Perse School
People from Newport, Isle of Wight
University of Paris alumni
University of Vienna alumni
1912 births
1998 deaths
20th-century English male actors
British Army personnel of World War II
British Army officers
People from Warbleton
British expatriates in France